Viscount Stuart of Findhorn, of Findhorn in the County of Moray, is a title in the Peerage of the United Kingdom. It was created on 20 November 1959 for the Conservative politician the Hon. James Stuart after his retirement from the House of Commons. Stuart was the third son of Morton Gray Stuart, 17th Earl of Moray (see Earl of Moray for earlier history of the family).  the title is held by his grandson, the third Viscount, who succeeded his father in 1999.

Viscounts Stuart of Findhorn (1959)
James Gray Stuart, 1st Viscount Stuart of Findhorn (1897–1971)
David Randolph Moray Stuart, 2nd Viscount Stuart of Findhorn (1924–1999)
James Dominic Stuart, 3rd Viscount Stuart of Findhorn (born 1948)

The heir presumptive is the present holder's half-brother, the Hon. Andrew Moray Stuart (born 1957). There are no other heirs to the title.

Arms

See also
Earl of Moray

Notes

References
Kidd, Charles, Williamson, David (editors). Debrett's Peerage and Baronetage (1990 edition). New York: St Martin's Press, 1990,

External links

Viscountcies in the Peerage of the United Kingdom
Noble titles created in 1959
Noble titles created for UK MPs